Pontefract was an English parliamentary constituency centred on the town of Pontefract in the West Riding of Yorkshire, which returned two Members of Parliament to the House of Commons briefly in the 13th century and again from 1621 until 1885, and one member from 1885 to 1974.

History

In the unreformed Parliaments (1295–1832)
Pontefract had representation in the Model Parliament of 1295, and in that which followed it in 1298, but gained a continuous franchise only from 1621. The constituency was a parliamentary borough, returning two members, consisting only of the town of Pontefract itself.

Until 1783, Pontefract was a burgage borough, where the right to vote was attached to the holders of about 325 specified properties in the borough. As in most burgage boroughs, the majority of the burgage tenements were concentrated in a small number of hands, giving their owners an effective stranglehold on the choice of representatives; but, since an individual could not vote more than once in person, however, many of the burgages he controlled, such a majority could only be exercised by conveying each of the properties to a reliable nominee at election time. In Pontefract the two chief landowners in the first half of the 18th century, George Morton Pitt and Lord Galway, owned between them a narrow majority of the burgages, but rather than putting in dummy voters to enforce their control they had preferred to reach an amicable settlement at each election with the remaining small burgage holders, who were mostly residents of the town. Consequently, the inhabitants generally had some voice in the choice of their MPs, as well as benefiting from the monetary outlay that the patrons expended to secure their goodwill.

However, in 1766 Pitt sold his burgages to John Walsh, who persuaded Galway to join him in abandoning canvassing and treating of the other voters, instead bringing in "faggot voters" to enforce their majority. At the next general election, in 1768, the indignant inhabitants put up their own candidates (Sir Rowland Winn and his brother), and a riot on polling day prevented the imported voters from reaching the polling booth. The election was declared void and Walsh's nominee duly returned at the by-election, but the townsmen refused to abandon their quest.

Defeated in 1774, when Charles James Fox stood as one of their candidates, they petitioned against the result, but the Commons upheld the burgage franchise. But in 1783, when they tried again, the Commons abandoned its usual practice of refusing to reconsider a decision on a constituency's franchise, and declared that the right to vote was properly vested in all the (male) resident householders; this remained the case for the final half-century of the unreformed Parliament.

By the time of the Great Reform Act in 1831, roughly 800 householders qualified to vote, and 699 did so in the contested election of 1830; the borough at this period had a total population of just under 5,000. Nevertheless, Pontefract still classed as a pocket borough, where the Earl of Harewood had the effective power to choose one of its two MPs.

After the Reform Act

The Reform Act of 1832 extended the boundaries of the constituency, bringing in the neighbouring townships of Tanshelf, Monkhill, Knottingley, Ferrybridge and Carleton, as well as Pontefract Castle and Pontefract Park, which had previously been excluded. This doubled the population to just over 10,000, in 4,832 houses.

In 1872 Pontefract became the first British constituency to hold a parliamentary election by secret ballot, at a by-election held shortly after the Act ending the old practice of open voting had come into effect.  There was considerable interest in the outcome, many observers believing that support for the parties might be drastically different once voters were able to make their choice in secret; but in the event the shares of the vote were much as they had been at the previous general election.  Hugh Childers was re-elected on 15 August 1872 following his appointment as Chancellor of the Duchy of Lancaster.  The Pontefract museum holds the original ballot box, sealed in wax with a liquorice stamp.

The third Reform Act, which came into effect at the general election of 1885, reduced Pontefract's representation from two members to one, though the boundaries remained essentially unchanged. In 1918, Pontefract became a county constituency, with boundaries extended to cover a much wider area – Pontefract itself, the towns of Knottingley and Goole, and the Pontefract and Goole rural districts.

At the 1950 general election Pontefract regained its borough status, being redrawn as a wholly urban constituency consisting of Pontefract, Castleford and Featherstone. From February 1974, the constituency was renamed Pontefract and Castleford, although its composition remained unchanged.

Members of Parliament

1621–1640

1640–1885

1885–1974

Notes

Elections

Elections in the 1830s

Elections in the 1840s

Elections in the 1850s
Martin resigned after being appointed a judge of the Court of the Exchequer, causing a by-election.

Elections in the 1860s
Overend resigned, causing a by-election.

 

Milnes was elevated to the peerage, becoming Lord Houghton and causing a by-election.

Childers was appointed a Civil Lord of the Admiralty, causing a by-election.

 
 

 
 

Childers was appointed First Lord of the Admiralty, causing a by-election.

Elections in the 1870s
Childers was appointed Chancellor of the Duchy of Lancaster, causing a by-election.

Elections in the 1880s 

Childers was appointed Secretary of State for War, requiring a by-election.

Elections in the 1890s 

Winn succeeded to the peerage, becoming Lord St Oswald.

The by-election was declared void on petition, requiring a by-election.

Elections in the 1900s

Elections in the 1910s 

General Election 1914–15:

Another General Election was required to take place before the end of 1915. The political parties had been making preparations for an election to take place and by the July 1914, the following candidates had been selected; 
Liberal: Handel Booth
Unionist: 
Labour:

Elections in the 1920s

Elections in the 1930s

Elections in the 1940s

Elections in the 1950s

Elections in the 1960s

Election in the 1970s

References

 Robert Beatson, "A Chronological Register of Both Houses of Parliament" (London: Longman, Hurst, Res & Orme, 1807) 
Bean, W. W., "The Parliamentary Representation of the Six Northern Counties of England" (Hull: Charles Henry Barnwell, 1890)
 John Brooke, The House of Commons 1754–1790: Introductory Survey (Oxford: Oxford University Press, 1968, reprinted from Volume I of Namier & Brooke, The History of Parliament: The House of Commons 1754–1790, London: HMSO, 1964)
"Cobbett's Parliamentary history of England, from the Norman Conquest in 1066 to the year 1803" (London: Thomas Hansard, 1808)
  
 
 J Holladay Philbin, "Parliamentary Representation 1832 – England and Wales" (New Haven: Yale University Press, 1965)
Frederic A Youngs, jr, "Guide to the Local Administrative Units of England, Vol II" (London: Royal Historical Society, 1991)

External links
 Pontefract elections

Parliamentary constituencies in Yorkshire and the Humber (historic)
Constituencies of the Parliament of the United Kingdom established in 1295
Constituencies of the Parliament of the United Kingdom established in 1621
Constituencies of the Parliament of the United Kingdom disestablished in 1974
Politics of Wakefield
Pontefract